Nam Gi-ae (Korean:남기애; born on 13 September 1961) is a South Korean actress in Chung-Ang University, Department of Theater and Film. She made her acting debut in 1998, since then, she has appeared in number of plays, films and television series. She is known for her supporting roles in Suspicious Partner (2017), Flower of Evil (2020), and Now, We Are Breaking Up (2021). She has acted in films such as: The Merciless (2017) and High Society (2018) among others.

Career
Nam Gi-ae is affiliated to artist management company Ace Factory since 2019. She made her acting debut in plays in 1998 and her TV series debut in 2015 in All About My Mom. Since then she has appeared in supporting roles in Oh My Venus (2015), Descendants of the Sun, Another Miss Oh , and MBC TV's fantasy comedy W (2016). In 2017, she got recognition by appearing in KBS's mystery comedy Ms. Perfect, Suspicious Partner, and JTBC's melodrama Rain or Shine. In 2018, Nam was seen in tvN's suspense drama Mother, KBS TV series Love to the End, Matrimonial Chaos and tvN's romance drama Encounter.

In 2019, Nam was part of main cast in tvN's legal drama Confession.

In 2020, she was cast in tvN's suspense TV series Flower of Evil. 

In 2021 she appeared in Sell Your Haunted House, Chimera, Jirisan, The Red Sleeve, SBS's romantic TV series Now, We Are Breaking Up as Kang Jeong-ja, mother of Song Hye-kyo's character and JTBC's mystery drama Artificial City.

In 2022 she appeared in JTBC's romantic drama Thirty-Nine as mother of the one of the main leads.

Filmography

Films

Television series

Theater

References

External links
 
 
 Nam Gi-ae on Daum 
 Nam Gi-ae on Play DB 
 Nam Gi-ae on KMDb 

21st-century South Korean actresses
South Korean film actresses
South Korean television actresses
Living people
1961 births
South Korean stage actresses